The Morro do Penedo Natural Monument is a municipal natural monument in the state of Espírito Santo, Brazil. It contains a small sugarloaf hill on the shore of the bay to the south of Vitória, the state capital.

Location

The Morro do Penedo Natural Monument is in the municipality of Vila Velha, Espírito Santo.
There are remnants of Atlantic Forest vegetation.

History

The Morro do Penedo Natural Monument was created by municipal decree 091/07 and regulated by law 4.930 of 2010.
It became part of the Central Atlantic Forest Ecological Corridor, created in 2002.
A project to implement a park in the natural monument was detailed in 2012, including a visitor center, gazebo, suspended forest walkways, a pier and a floating dock.
An access tower between the Morro da Urca and Morro do Penedo was also planned, a rainwater collection system, and restoration of a stone house as a museum.
In July 2015 a steel cable used to climb the hill was removed for safety reasons.
City officials said another, safer climbing route would be made.

Notes

Sources

Natural monuments of Brazil
Protected areas of Espírito Santo
2010 establishments in Brazil